Kiriri people are indigenous people of Eastern Brazil. Their name is also spelled Cariri or Kariri and is a Tupi word meaning "silent" or "taciturn".

History
The French Capuchin missionary Martin of Nantes (1638–1714) was the apostle of the Kariri people on the São Francisco River between 1672 and 1683.

The various Kariri peoples were settled in different towns (aldeia) and villages (vila), listed as follows.

Territory
Today a large portion of their traditional homelands is still called the Cariris region. Within this region are two cities, Crato and Juazeiro do Norte.

The Chapada Diamantina has a dramatic landscape with high plains, table-top mesas, and steep cliffs or towers known as 'tepuy.' Before the arrival of the Portuguese in the 19th century, the only local inhabitants of the region were indigenous Indians from the Maracas and Cariris tribes. In 1985, the Chapada Diamantina National Park was created with its headquarters in Palmeiras.

Kiriri people live in the Kiriri Indigenous Territory, an indigenous territory. Through their successful political organization, they were able to expel 1,200 non-native squatters from their lands since 1990.

Notes

External links
Ritual of the Toré

Indigenous peoples in Brazil
Indigenous peoples of Eastern Brazil